The men's large hill individual ski jumping competition for the 1992 Winter Olympics was held in Tremplin du Praz. It occurred on 16 February.

Results

References

Ski jumping at the 1992 Winter Olympics